Will Hayes (born 5 June 1995) is an Australian rules footballer who formerly played for the Western Bulldogs and the Carlton Football Club in the Australian Football League (AFL).

Early career

After failing to get drafted, Hayes joined Footscray in 2014. Hard work and steady improvement  saw him play in the 2016 VFL premiership team and then in 2018 he won his club's best and fairest. He spent five seasons with the Bulldogs before his hard work and consistency had the  select him in the 2018 NAB AFL Draft.

AFL career

He was selected at pick #78 in the 2018 national draft. He made his senior debut against Carlton in round 5 of the 2019 season.

After 11 games in 3 years Hayes was delisted at the conclusion of the 2021 AFL season. He joined the Carlton Football Club's reserves team in 2022, and his career was given a lifeline when  selected him in the 2022 mid season draft. He played two senior matches in the latter half of the 2022 season before again being delisted.

Personal life

He graduated from Melbourne Grammar School in 2013 alongside close friend and fellow footballer Zach Merrett. He is the son of racehorse trainer David Hayes. 
Hayes studied a Bachelor of Commerce at Deakin University, and now works at Flemington Racecourse.

References

External links

Will Hayes from AFL Tables

Western Bulldogs players
1995 births
Living people
Australian rules footballers from Victoria (Australia)
Carlton Football Club players